Harihar Bhawan is a Rana palace in Patan, Nepal the capital of the Nepal. The palace complex, located west of the Shree Durbar, was incorporated in an impressive and vast array of courtyards, gardens and buildings.

History
The palace complex lay in the heart of Kathmandu, to the west of the Shree Durbar. 
Build by Chandra Shumsher Jung Bahadur Rana for his second son Sankar Shamsher Jang Bahadur Rana. After death of his father in 1929, Shankar Shamsher moved to Harihar Bhawan and stayed there until 1950, when he was sent to The UK as the ambassador of Kingdom of Nepal. In 1953, Shankar Shumsher was recalled from service but he choose to stay in the UK.

Under Government of Nepal
After Shankar Shumsher stayed in the UK, The Government of Nepal nationalized all his properties along with Harihar Bhawan 
Currently this palace is occupied by Department of Agriculture, National Library of Nepal and National Human Rights Commission.

Earthquake 2015

This palace was partially damaged during the April 2015 Nepal earthquake. Harihar Bhawanwas designated unsafe and received a red sticker. Currently the Department of Agriculture, National Library of Nepal and National Human Rights Commission has started evacuation. The future of this historical building is unknown.

See also
Babarmahal Revisited
Thapathali Durbar
Garden of Dreams
Rana palaces of Nepal

References

Palaces in Kathmandu
Rana palaces of Nepal